The 2004–05 ACB season was the 22nd season of the Liga ACB. 

|}
|}

Playoffs

See also 
Liga ACB

External links
 ACB.com 
 linguasport.com 

 
Liga ACB seasons
 
Spain